Hallsville Independent School District is a public school district based in Hallsville, Texas (USA).

In addition to Hallsville, the district serves a small portion of Longview as well as rural areas in western Harrison County.

In 2009, the school district was rated "academically acceptable" by the Texas Education Agency.

In 2010, the entire school district was rated "Exemplary" by the Texas Education Agency.

HISD is a "district of innovation" or DOI. A DOI is "traditional independent school districts most of the flexibilities available to Texas' open-enrollment charter schools. To access these flexibilities, a school district must adopt an innovation plan, as set forth in Texas Education Code chapter 12A."

Schools
Hallsville High School (Grades 9-12)
Hallsville Junior High School (Grades 6-8)
Hallsville Intermediate School (Grades 4-5)
Hallsville East Elementary School (Grades PK-3)
Hallsville North Elementary School (Grades ECD/PK-3)

In Fall 2022, Hallsville West Elementary will open, however, not at the current building location. Due to construction issues, the campus located on Loop 281 in Longview, TX, will not be completed in time for the 2022-23 academic school year. HISD announced that the current Intermediate 5th Grade campus will become Hallsville West for one academic year. Because of this, 5th grade students will attend Intermediate 4th grade campus.  West is scheduled to have grades PK-3.

References

External links
 Hallsville Independent School District
 TEA Accountability District Search

School districts in Harrison County, Texas